KKNU is a commercial country music radio station in Springfield, Oregon, broadcasting to the Eugene-Springfield, Oregon area on 93.3 FM.  It is owned by Mckenzie River Broadcasting.

Syndicated programming included After Midnite with Blair Garner hosted by Blair Garner from Premiere Radio Networks.

History
Throughout the 1980s, and into the early 1990s, 93.1 KSND (known as “K-Sound” or “The Sound” for a time) had a Top 40 format.  It was an affiliate of Rick Dees Weekly Top 40.

In late 1992, KSND was sold to McKenzie River Broadcasting, Inc. which ended the longtime Top 40 format at the end of year.  On January 1, 1993, KSND began a two week long simulcast with its new sister station; “Magic 94” KMGE.  In mid January, “New Country 93” debuted with “Today’s Hottest New Country” and the new call letters; KKNU.

In 2006, KKNU moved from 93.1 to 93.3, to allow KAST-FM (now KRYP) to move into the Portland market on the 93.1 frequency.

Translators
KKNU programming is also carried on a network of broadcast translator stations to extend or improve the coverage area of the station.

References

External links
KKNU official website

KNU
Country radio stations in the United States
Springfield, Oregon
Radio stations established in 1958
1958 establishments in Oregon